A referendum on the Maastricht Treaty was held in France on 20 September 1992. It was approved by only 51% of the voters. The result of the referendum, known as the "petit oui", along with the Danish "No" vote are considered to be signals of the end of the "permissive consensus" on European integration which had existed in most of continental Europe until then. From this point forward issues relating to European integration were subject to much greater scrutiny across much of Europe, and overt euroscepticism gained prominence. Only France, Ireland and Denmark held referendums on Maastricht ratification.

Parties' stances 
The center-left Socialist party (PS), then in power, as well as the center-right Union for French Democracy (UDF) campaigned in favor of the treaty. Jacques Chirac, then Mayor of Paris and leader of the Gaullist RPR party, also took a pro-European stance, partly in the hopes to boost his chances for the next Presidential election.

On the other side, the Euroskeptic faction of the Rally for the Republic (RPR), dissented from its leader and heralded the "no" vote. Communists also opposed what they considered as an advance of neo-liberalism. Jean-Marie Le Pen's Front National was also strongly opposed to any integration. 

The Trotskytes from Lutte Ouvrière called for an abstention.

Support:
 Socialist party (PS)
 Union for French Democracy (UDF)
Opponents:
 left-wing:
 Jean-Pierre Chevènement
 French Communist Party (PCF) 
 Revolutionary Communist League (LCR)
 right-wing:
 major figures in the Gaullist Rally for the Republic (RPR) including Philippe Séguin and Charles Pasqua (but not leader Jacques Chirac, and the then-lesser known Nicolas Sarkozy and François Fillon)
 Philippe de Villiers
 National Front
Abstain:
 Workers' Struggle (LO) (Arlette Laguiller was quoted as saying "A 'no' vote is a vote for Le Pen")

Those who opposed the ratification also included demographer Emmanuel Todd, on the basis of his work on European anthropology, arguing that differences between cultures would be too strong for a common currency to work.

Campaign 

The introduction of a common currency was the most debated aspect of the campaign. The three major right-wing figures campaigning against it, Philippe Séguin, Charles Pasqua and Philippe de Villiers, often named souverainists, were arguing that it would be a blow to French monetary independence, and political sovereignty as a whole. Séguin and de Villiers were coming from the top school for senior  civil service, the ÉNA, just like left-wing dissenter Jean-Pierre Chevènement.

The sovereignist campaign gained an unexpected momentum, beating the 'yes' vote in some polls.

Philippe Séguin and President François Mitterrand famously faced off in a passionate but nevertheless respectful television debate, also remembered for the fact that Mitterrand was in the midst of a cancer treatment, something hidden from the public at the time.

Results

By departement

References

1992 referendums
1992 in France
1992 elections in France
Referendums in France
1992 in international relations
1992 in the European Economic Community
France and the European Union
Referendums related to the European Union
Treaty on European Union